Stefanos Lekkas (born January 17, 1996) is an American professional ice hockey goaltender who is currently playing with Odense Bulldogs of the Metal Ligaen (DEN).

Playing career

Junior
Lekkas played for the Springfield Jr. Blues of the NAHL and the Sioux Falls Stampede of the USHL. He helped lead the Stampede to a Clark Cup championship in the 2014–15 season.

College
Lekkas played four seasons for the University of Vermont. He played 134 games for the Catamounts and set a Hockey East record for the most career saves (3,913). He also left as the Catamounts' all-time leader in save percentage (.918).

Professional
After his junior season at Vermont, Lekkas was invited to development camps by the NHL's Chicago Blackhawks and Florida Panthers but was not signed. Instead, he returned to college, and signed with the Fort Wayne Komets of the ECHL after his senior season.

He was loaned to the Rochester Americans of the AHL on March 15, 2021. The team signed him to a professional tryout contract two days later. Lekkas was signed to a one-year contract by the NHL's Buffalo Sabres on May 5, 2021.

After he was not tendered a qualifying offer by the Sabres to retain his rights, Lekkas returned his ECHL club, the Fort Wayne Komets, agreeing to a one-year contract on July 29, 2021. Lekkas was later released and bounced around between the Orlando Solar Bears and Wheeling Nailers, before being traded to the Maine Mariners. After helping the Mariners reach their first postseason appearance in franchise history, Maine loaned him to the Chicago Wolves of the AHL for the 2022 Calder Cup playoffs.

On June 16, 2022, Lekkas as a free agent opted to pursue a European career in agreeing to a one-year contract with Danish club, Odense Bulldogs of the Metal Ligaen.

References

External links
 

1996 births
Living people
American ice hockey goaltenders
Fort Wayne Komets players
Ice hockey players from Illinois
People from Kane County, Illinois
Maine Mariners (ECHL) players
Odense Bulldogs players
Orlando Solar Bears (ECHL) players
Rochester Americans players
Sioux Falls Stampede players
Springfield Jr. Blues players
Vermont Catamounts men's ice hockey players
Wheeling Nailers players